U.S. Route 27 (US 27) in Tennessee runs from the Georgia state line in Chattanooga to the Kentucky state line in Isham.

Route description 

US 27 enters Tennessee from Rossville, Georgia in Hamilton County, as a four-lane highway, concurrent with both SR 27 and SR 29. The route goes north as Rossville Boulevard, going through suburbs and passing by several businesses before entering Chattanooga and coming to an interchange with I-24 (Exit 180 A/B) and briefly running concurrently with the interstate, having interchanges with SR 58 (Market Street) and US 11/US 41/US 64/US 72/SR 2, before splitting off as a freeway (Exit 178).

Freeway segment 

The highway goes north as a narrow four-lane freeway (concurrent with unsigned I-124) through downtown and has interchanges with West Main Street (Exit 1), Martin Luther King Boulevard (Exit 1 A/B; unsigned SR 316), and Fourth Street (Exit 1C; unsigned SR 389) before crossing the Tennessee River on the P.R. Olgiati Bridge, where it widens to eight lanes and unsigned I-124 ends. It then has interchanges with Manufacturer's Road and Dayton Boulevard (Old US 27; unsigned SR 8) before crossing Stringer's Ridge to have an interchange with the national southern terminus of US 27's only auxiliary route, US 127, which is where SR 27 splits off to go north on that route. From here, the route is part of Corridor J of the Appalachian Development Highway System. US 27/SR 29 then narrow to six lanes and runs on top of a ridge while passing through Red Bank, where it has interchanges with Morrison Springs Road, where it narrows to four lanes, Mountain Creek Road, SR 153 southbound and Dayton Pike northbound (once again, the old route of US 27), before entering Soddy Daisy. The route continues north with interchanges at Thrasher Pike and Harrison Lane before having an interchange at Sequoyah Access Road, the main route to the Sequoyah Nuclear Power Plant. It then has an interchange with SR 319 (Hixson Pike) before running along the Tennessee river to a massive interchange with SR 111, which splits off to the northwest for Dunlap, where the freeway ends. The freeway continues along SR 111.

Hamilton County to Kentucky line 

US 27 continues as a four-lane divided highway through the small towns of Sale Creek and Graysville, where it intersects with SR 303, before crossing into Rhea County, and reaching Graysville. The route then enters Dayton at the intersection with SR 378 (Market Street; Old US 27) and SR 60 (Hiwassee Highway). It bypasses downtown to the east and intersects SR 30. US 27 then has another intersection with SR 378 before it leaves Dayton and continues northward through Evensville before becoming concurrent with SR 68 and arriving at Spring City. It then has an interchange where SR 68 splits off to the west, while US 27 enters downtown and intersects with SR 302. It then leaves Spring City and continues north through farmland.

From here, US 27 enters Roane County and runs through Glen Alice before becoming concurrent with US 70/SR 1 and entering the city of Rockwood. They go straight through town, passing just east of downtown before US 70 splits to the east, taking SR 1 and SR 29 with it. US 27 then runs concurrently with SR 61 (which is signed, except on I-40), as that highway begins here. US 27/SR 61 then pass through Cardiff, where they intersect with the short SR 382, which provides access to Roane State Community College. They then enter Harriman, and pass through countryside before coming to an interchange with I-40 (Exit 347). During this stretch, it forms part of the Harvey H. Hannah Memorial Highway, and is signed as such. They then enter the South Harriman neighborhood and pass by several businesses and rejoin with SR 29 (Ruritain Road). They then cross the bridge over the Emory River to enter and pass through the historic downtown, intersecting with SR 328. Just beyond Harriman, near the DeArmond community, US 27/SR 29 then splits from SR 61 at an interchange, with the Harvey H. Hannah Memorial Highway following that route to the east. US 27/SR 29 then begin to ascend the Cumberland Plateau as it then narrows to two lanes, and continues northward across the plateau for its remaining  or so in Tennessee.

In Morgan County, the highway passes through the rugged mountains of the Cumberland Plateau and has another intersection with SR 328 before ascending a ridge to enter Mossy Grove. It passes through Mossy Grove and has an intersection with Clayton Howard Road, which provides access to Lone Mountain State Forest. It then leaves the town and continues north to an intersection with Main Street (Old US 27 in Downtown) just before entering Wartburg. US 27/SR 29 then widen to 4 lanes just before the intersection with SR 62 and becomes concurrent with that route. They go north, bypassing downtown to the east before leaving Wartburg at the intersection with Old Gobey Road, which heads off to Gobey. The highway then descends down a mountain and narrows to 2 lanes once again just before another crossing of the Emory River. They then have an intersection with Gobey Road, another access road to Gobey, before SR 62 splits off to the west. US 27/SR 29 then becomes narrow, curvy, and winding as it passes through  rural areas. With nowhere to pass a slow car, the highway passes by the Morgan County fairgrounds before passing through the town of Annadel. It does not have any passing lanes before entering the town of Sunbright. US 27/SR 29 passes through the center of town, having Intersections with SR 329 and Burrville Road, an access road to Burrville. It then becomes even curvier as it leaves Morgan County to cross into Scott County. For the next  it has one place to pass with a  speed limit. US 27/SR 29 then passes through the community of Glenmary before entering Elgin, where the highway intersects SR 52, which connects the area with the historic village of Rugby and Fentress County to the west.

Beyond Elgin, US 27/SR 29 passes through Robbins, the county seat of Huntsville (where it intersects with SR 63, becomes concurrent with SR 297, and widens to 4 lanes), and Helenwood before reaching the city of Oneida.

In Oneida, the highway passes through a major business district before narrowing to 2 lanes again before entering downtown and having an intersection with SR 456 just before passing by Big South Fork Medical Center. SR 297 then splits off to the west in the center of town, which provides access to the Big South Fork National River and Recreation Area. US 27/SR 29 then passes through the rest of downtown before leaving Oneida and passes through Winfield, the last sizable town that US 27 passes through in Tennessee before it reaches the community of Isham on the Kentucky border, where SR 29 ends and US 27 continues north into McCreary County.

History 
The route in Hamilton County was removed from its original location to build the controlled-access highway. The original route ran across the Market Street Bridge, and becomes what is now called Dayton Boulevard, which then runs through Red Bank, east of the current route, and Soddy-Daisy, west of the current route. The majority of this route still remains, and is sometimes referred to as "Old US 27" or "Old 27."

The first part of the controlled-access segment, located between Martin Luther King Jr. Boulevard and what is now the interchange with Dayton Pike was built between 1955 and 1959 by moving dirt from nearby Cameron Hill. This segment was extended south to Interstate 24 and north to the terminus of US 127, both between 1960 and 1963, when the corresponding section of I-24 was built. Part of this route was once signed as I-124. The designation still exists, but the signage was removed in the late 1980s when the interchange with I-24 was rebuilt. The controlled-access portion between State Route 153 and State Route 319 (Hixson Pike) was built between 1975 and 1977. Construction on the controlled-access segment between US 127 and SR 153 was scheduled to begin in 1980, but was delayed multiple times. It was finally constructed between 1985 and 1989. SR 111 was extended over Walden Ridge to Dunlap in the earlier 1990s, and the controlled access segment of US 27 was extended approximately 1.75 miles north to the terminus at this time.

The entire route has been widened to a four-lane highway all the way to the split with SR 61.

Beginning in February 1999, the Olgiati Bridge was widened from four to six lanes. This was accomplished by attaching steel beams to the top of the posts over the river. Also in this project, a ramp was added from the bridge on the north side to Manufacturer's Road, replacing a cloverleaf loop ramp which diverged past the ramp. The project, after many delays, was completed in February 2003.

Beginning in the middle of 2012, the Tennessee Department of Transportation (TDOT) began rebuilding US 27 from the Olgiati Bridge to the interchange with US 127. The project involved the replacement of old bridges, widening from two lanes each way to three to four lanes each way, and construction of several retaining walls. Preparations for this project had begun in December 2011. The project was completed in early 2015, months ahead of schedule.

In December 2015, TDOT began a $126 million reconstruction project to rebuild US 27 from I-24 to the recently reconstructed part. The project will widen the route from the existing two to three lanes each direction to three or four lanes each direction (including two more across the Olgiati), straighten out curvy sections, rework the Fourth Street and Martin Luther King interchanges, and add retaining walls. The project was expected to be complete by July 31, 2019, but due to delays is not expected to be complete until December 2020. The substructure of the Olgiati Bridge was built wider than the superstructure in anticipation of future widening in the first widening project.

Major intersections

State Route 29

State Route 29 (SR 29) runs as a secret, or hidden designation, throughout US 27's routing from the Georgia state line in Chattanooga to the Kentucky state line north of Oneida, though it does separate in Rockwood at an intersection with US 70/SR 1, becoming concurrent with it till Midtown, where it becomes signed as a standalone secondary highway (Pine Ridge Road) and has an interchange with I-40 before entering the South Harriman neighborhood of Harriman (as Ruritan Road) and then becoming hidden again at an intersection with US 27/SR 61 south of downtown. Excluding this signed portion, the rest of SR 29 is a primary highway. In downtown Oneida, SR 29 has received a signed designation.

Major intersections
(This only applies to the standalone portion)

References

External links

 

 Tennessee
Transportation in Chattanooga, Tennessee
Transportation in Hamilton County, Tennessee
Transportation in Rhea County, Tennessee
Transportation in Roane County, Tennessee
Transportation in Morgan County, Tennessee
Transportation in Scott County, Tennessee
Freeways in Tennessee
27